Eigil Bryld is a Danish cinematographer. He is famous for his work in such films and TV shows as House of Cards (2013), In Bruges (2008), You Don't Know Jack (2010), Becoming Jane (2007) and Kinky Boots (2005).

Life and career
Bryld grew up in Denmark, and as a teenager used to work in a local television station. He earned a degree in film and video production from Gwent College in Wales in 1992, where he studied under photographer David Hurn. He worked in London before moving to New York City. His credits include Wisconsin Death Trip which won him the 2001 BAFTA Award for best factual photography and You Don't Know Jack for which he was nominated for a Primetime Emmy Award. He served as the cinematographer for the 2013 Netflix series House of Cards, for which he was awarded the Primetime Emmy Award for Outstanding Cinematography for a Single-Camera Series.

Personal life 
Bryld is married to Danish author Naja Marie Aidt and they had a son in 2003.

Filmography

Film

Television
TV series

TV movies

References

External links
 Official website
 

Danish cinematographers
Living people
Year of birth missing (living people)